Chalcosyrphus valgus is a medium-sized species of hoverfly with a widespread range throughout the Palearctic region.

Distribution
Europe, Japan.

References

External links

Eristalinae
Insects described in 1790
Diptera of Europe
Diptera of Asia
Taxa named by Johann Friedrich Gmelin